Oji, Ōji or OJI may refer to:

People
 Chibuzor Oji (born 1977), stage name Faze, Nigerian musician and actor
 Geoffrey Oji, Nigerian singer and songwriter, winner of the seventh season of Project Fame West Africa
 Megumi Ōji (born 1975), Japanese actress
 Sam Oji (1985–2021), English footballer
 Oji Umozurike, Nigerian law professor, activist and former chairman of the African Commission on Human and Peoples' Rights
 Tshi, also called Oji, a group of tribes in Ghana

Places
 Ōji, Nara, a town in Nara Prefecture, Japan
 Ōji Station (Nara), a railway station 
 Ōji Station (Tokyo), a railway station 
 O-J-I, also called Oji, a mountain in Baxter State Park, Maine, United States

Other uses
 Oji Paper Company, a Japanese paper manufacturer
 Open Java Interface
 Ọjị (Igbo for the kola nut), an important component of Igbo culture
 Mochizō Ōji, a main character in Tamako Market, a Japanese anime television series
 Gohei and Michiko Ōji, Mochizō's parents